The Hellenic Journal is a monthly news magazine aimed at the Greek-American community of the western United States.

History and profile
Hellenic Journal was founded by Frank Peter Agnost and the first issue appeared in April 1975. The magazine was first based in Mississippi and is headquartered in San Francisco. It delivers news each month about Greece, local communities, features, organizations, cuisine, sports, dancing and much more to an audience of savvy readers embracing Greek life.

References

External links
Official site

Monthly magazines published in the United States
News magazines published in the United States
Greek-American mass media
Greek-American culture in California
Local interest magazines published in the United States
Magazines established in 1975
Magazines published in San Francisco
Magazines published in Mississippi